InterContinental Danang Sun Peninsula Resort is a resort & spa in Da Nang, Vietnam. It is one of the resorts under the management of InterContinental Hotels Group in Vietnam. The resort opened on June 1, 2012.

Location 
InterContinental Danang Sun Peninsula Resort is located in the Sơn Trà Peninsula of Da Nang, which is also known as Monkey Mountain. It is about a 30-minute drive from Danang International Airport and also the downtown of Danang. This resort occupied 39 hectare of the peninsula which also included the 700-meter of private beach. The traditional Vietnamese town of Hoi An is approximately 45 minutes away from the resort.

Design 
This resort was designed by Bill Bensley, a Harvard-educated architect and landscape designer. The design of the resort is inspired by the culture of traditional Vietnamese with luxury and contemporary elements. The resort was under construction for over 6 years before the official opening date.

Facilities 
This resort has 200 rooms and suites in total with selections of room types. Due to its unusual landscape, the resort build a cable car called "Nam Tram" to elevate the guests to each of the levels and each outlet is located in different level. Others facilities include a children's playroom, games center, fitness center, 2 outdoor pools, library and daily activities.

It has a HARNN Asian heritage spa with treatment rooms.

Dining 
 Citron - Serves Vietnamese cuisine and Mediterranean cuisine with a private dining booth floated 100 meters above the sea level
 La Maison 1888 - La Maison 1888 has cuisine designed by three-star Michelin chef Pierre Gagnaire. 
 Buffalo Bar – Located within La Maison 1888
 Barefoot – A beach front restaurant
 L_o_n_g Bar – A beach front lounge

Awards 
 First Vietnamese resort hotel to be featured on the front page of the world-famous Conde Nast Traveller
 Luxe List 2012 Destin Asian
 Fodor’s 100 hotels award 2012
 Conde Nast Traveller Hot List 2013 The Best New Hotels of 2013
 Luxury 50 World Spa and Travel
 Travelers' Choice 2013, Top 25 Hotels in Vietnam TripAdvisor
 Travelers' Choice 2013, Top 25 Luxury Hotels in Vietnam TripAdvisor

References

Further reading

External links
 

Hotels in Vietnam
Resorts in Vietnam
Buildings and structures in Da Nang
Tourist attractions in Da Nang
InterContinental hotels
Hotels established in 2012
Hotel buildings completed in 2012
2012 establishments in Vietnam